The Netherlands was represented by Linda Williams, with the song "Het is een wonder", at the 1981 Eurovision Song Contest, which took place in Dublin on 4 April. "Het is een wonder" was the winner of the Dutch national final for the contest, held on 11 March. Previous Dutch entrant Ben Cramer (1973) and future representative Maribelle (1984) were among the acts taking part.

Before Eurovision

Nationaal Songfestival 1981 
The final was held at the Theater Zuidplein in Rotterdam, hosted by Fred Oster and Elles Berger. Five acts took part performing two songs each and voting was by 12 regional juries, who each had 10 points to divide between the songs. "Het is een wonder" was the only song to receive votes from every jury and emerged the winner by a 7-point margin.

At Eurovision 
On the night of the final Williams performed 11th in the running order, following Spain and preceding Ireland. At the close of voting "Het is een wonder" had received 51 points from 12 countries, placing the Netherlands 9th of the 20 entries. The Dutch jury awarded its 12 points to contest winners the United Kingdom.

The Dutch conductor at the contest was Rogier van Otterloo.

Voting

References

External links 
 Dutch Preselection 1981

1981
Countries in the Eurovision Song Contest 1981
Eurovision